Île Bizard is an island near the Island of Montreal in the Hochelaga Archipelago region.

History

Historically named Île Bonaventure, by 1723 it had come to be named Île Bizard, after Jacques Bizard, to whom it was conceded as a fief in 1678, part of the seigneurial system of New France.  The island was also used by the settlers of New France, as a way to get timber into Montreal from the river using timber rafting.

Modern
It was formerly a separate municipality named St Raphael de L'Île-Bizard, but was forcefully merged with of the city of Montreal, and made into the borough of L'Île-Bizard–Sainte-Geneviève.
A referendum to demerge on June 20, 2004 was held. Although more than 50% voted to demerge, it was unsuccessful as this represented fewer than the required 35% of the electorate.

Geography

The Jacques Bizard Bridge connects it across the Rivière des Prairies with Sainte-Geneviève on the Island of Montreal.  The seasonal Laval-sur-le-Lac Île-Bizard Ferry provides a connection to Laval-sur-le-Lac on Île Jésus (Laval). This ferry does not operate in the winter.

Land use

Bois-de-l'Île-Bizard Nature Park is a 201-hectare (500 acre) park which contains marsh lands and several kilometres (miles) of nature trails, accessible year round.  There is also a small beach at Pointe-aux-Carrières that faces the Lac des Deux-Montagnes.  The Royal Montreal Golf Club, the Golf Saint-Raphael and Elm Ridge Country Club are located on the island.

Land has been reserved on the island for the future extension of Autoroute 440 from Laval to connect with Autoroute 40 at Chemin Ste-Marie. This will avoid having to drive on the Autoroute 40 to get to Autoroute 13 and Autoroute 15 and provide another beltway around the city in addition to Autoroute 30 on the South Shore. Many people who live on the island are against it, as Île Bizard is a calm and serene country environment and they feel like it would cause more traffic and pollution to the fresh air.

However, the City of Montreal has purchased considerable amounts of land and protects them as nature parks, which include swamps, beaches, forests and other ecosystems; these are open to the public.

Sports
The island has two notable sports complexes: 'Parc Eugène-Dostie' and 'Complexe Sportif Saint-Raphaël'. The PGA Golf Tour comes to l'Île Bizard's Royal Montreal golf course every few years. A notable native is Vincent Lecavalier, a former NHL player who was raised on the island. Former NHL players Guy Lafleur and Guy Carbonneau also live on the island.

See also
 List of bridges spanning the Rivière des Prairies
 List of crossings of the Rivière des Prairies
 List of islands of Quebec

References

External links

 Official page on the Ville de Montréal website .

Bizard
Landforms of Montreal
L'Île-Bizard–Sainte-Geneviève
River islands of Quebec
West Island